Joe Hart (May 8, 1944 – September 11, 2022) was an American politician who served as the 11th State Mine Inspector of Arizona (2007–2021) and as a Member of the Arizona House of Representatives representing Arizona's 2nd Legislative District (1992–2001). He was a member of the Republican Party.

Education and career
Hart attended Fullerton Junior College and Mohave Community College.

Hart previously worked for the Black Mountain Cattle Company, as the Safety Inspector for the Duval Mining Corporation (then owner of the Mineral Park mine) and at Hart to Hart Trucking. He was also the owner of radio stations KGMN, KZKE, and KYET, and television station KKAX-LD.

Legal issues 
In 2017, Hart was arrested on suspicion of domestic violence following a physical altercation with his 59 year old nephew. The fight was instigated by a disagreement over repairs to a water pipe. This charge was later dismissed by the Kingman city attorney.

Electoral history

References 
 
 Page about Hart on his rally website.

External links
 

 Joe Hart's blog

1944 births
2022 deaths
20th-century American politicians
21st-century American politicians
Arizona State Mine Inspector
Republican Party members of the Arizona House of Representatives
People from Kingman, Arizona